Leonard Richardson is a personal name that may refer to:

Leon Richardson (born 12 February 1957), Antiguan former cyclist
Len Richardson (athlete) (1881–1955), South African long-distance runner
Leonard Richardson (decathlete), Saint Kitts and Nevis. Bronze Medal winner at the 1986 Pan American Junior Athletics Championships
Leonard Richardson (industrialist), father of Milo Barnum Richardson
Leonard Richardson (record producer) (Nubian M.O.B.)
Leonard Richardson (video game developer). See Resource-oriented architecture, robotfindskitten